The Sermon of Saint Stephen  is an oil-on-canvas by Italian artist of the Venetian school Vittore Carpaccio, painted in 1514. It is now in the Louvre in Paris.

History
This painting was one of five scenes representing the life of Saint Stephen, painted between 1511 and 1514 for the Scuola dei Lanieri, Santo Stefano (Venice). The series was broken up in 1806, when the religious houses were suppressed. Two panels went to the Brera Gallery, Milan; in 1812, Vivant Denon exchanged some of the northern paintings in the Louvre for Italian works in the Brera, and one of these panels was transferred under this arrangement. Another is in Berlin; one has disappeared, and the fifth is in Stuttgart.

The Sermon of Saint Stephen the deacon, represented in this Louvre painting, took place in Jerusalem. This gave Carpaccio an excuse for filling his canvas with picturesque oriental costumes and architecture. Jerusalem in the early days of Christianity is here identified as Constantinople (actually Yoros Castle on the opposite side of the Bosphorus ) - a fantastic and imaginary Constantinople full of Turkish, antique, Byzantine and Italian elements. Carpaccio refers with pride, in a letter to the Marquis of Mantua, to a view of Jerusalem which he had painted.

See also
Venetian school (art)
Jerusalem

References

Sources
 Patricia Fortini Brown, Venetian Narrative Painting in the Age of Carpaccio (New Haven and London:  Yale University Press, 1988/1994)
 Augusto Gentili, Le storie di Carpaccio. Venezia, i turchi, gli ebrei, Marsilio, (2006) 
 Peter Humfrey, Carpaccio, Chaucer Press (2005)
 Stefania Mason & Andrew Ellis, Carpaccio: The Major Pictorial Cycles: The Narrative Paintings, Skira (2000)

External links

Louvre's respective entry 
www.VittoreCarpaccio.org 150 works by Vittore Carpaccio
Paintings by Vittore Carpaccio
Nurturing art in the Venetian scuole, Roderick Conway Morris, International Herald Tribune, FEBRUARY 26, 2005
Web Gallery of Art

1514 paintings
Paintings by Vittore Carpaccio
Paintings in the Louvre by Italian artists
Paintings of Saint Stephen